Holomek is a surname. Notable people with the surname include:

 Patrik Holomek (born 1974), Czech footballer
 Pavel Holomek (born 1972), Czech footballer

Czech-language surnames